Herbert Hall may refer to:

 Herb Hall (1907–1996), American jazz clarinetist and alto saxophonist
 Herb Hall (baseball) (1893–1970), Major League Baseball pitcher
 Herbert Hall (bishop) (1889–1955), bishop of Aberdeen and Orkney, Scotland
 Herbie Hall (1926-2013), British Olympic wrestler

See also
Bert Hall (disambiguation)